He Is the Light is an album by Al Green, released in 1985. It was Green's first album for A&M Records.

The album peaked at No. 11 on the Billboard Top Gospel Albums chart.

Production
The album marked the return of producer Willie Mitchell, who had last worked on 1976's Have a Good Time. It was recorded at Royal Studios, with many of the same musicians Green employed in the 1970s.

Critical reception
Robert Christgau wrote that "Leroy Hodges's famous bottom keeps the record flowing like none of Green's other Jesus LPs, but it's still songs that make or break--and in this case do neither." Rolling Stone declared that "the only great new Al Green song here is 'Power', which builds on 'Jesus Is Waiting' and 'Have You Been Making Out O.K.' but claims its own space in the pantheon." The Globe and Mail called He Is the Light "a gorgeous record: spare, crisp production, and tunes that haunt you."

Track listing
"Going Away" (Al Green) – 3:38
"True Love" (Green, Willie Mitchell) – 4:31
"He Is the Light" (Mitchell, Julius Bradley) – 3:24
"I Feel Like Going On" (Green) – 3:13
"Be with Me Jesus" (Sam Cooke) – 2:54
"You Brought the Sunshine" (Elbernita Clark) – 5:10
"Power" (Green, Mitchell) – 5:21
"Building Up" (Green) – 3:10
"Nearer My God to Thee" – 3:46

Personnel 
 Al Green – lead and backing vocals, guitars, arrangements (9)
 Perry Michael Allen – keyboards, synthesizer, percussion, string arrangements, synthesizer arrangements
 Andrew Jackson – keyboards
 David Cousar – guitars
 Angelo Earl – guitars
 Teenie Hodges – guitars
 Perry Michael Allen – keyboards, synthesizers, percussion, string arrangements, synthesizer arrangements
 Steve Cobb – bass
 Leroy Hodges – bass
 Jimmy Kinnard – bass
 Steve Potts – drums
 Gary Topper – baritone saxophone
 Andrew Love – tenor saxophone
 Jack Hale – trombone
 Ben Cauley – trumpet
 Willie Mitchell – horn and string arrangements
 The Memphis Strings – strings
 Kelli Bruce – backing vocals
 Debbie Jamison – backing vocals
 Michelle Omata – backing vocals

Production 
 Producer and Engineer – Willie Mitchell
 Remix – Perry Michael Allen and Willie Mitchell
 Mastered by Larry Nix at Ardent Studios (Memphis, TN)
 Art Direction – Chuck Beeson and Jeff Gold
 Design – Melanie Nissen
 Photography – Mark Hanauer

References

1985 albums
Al Green albums